Roberto Bienzobas Gárate (1962, Bilbao, Spain) is a Basque musician, conductor, composer and choir director.

Life and career 

He was born in Bilbao. Since he was young, he studied harmony, chamber music, and orchestra and choral conducting. He studied counterpoint, fugue and composition with Francisco Escudero.

He has worked as a musician and director of orchestras and choirs. He has also worked as a musician, trainer and teacher of musicians and composers in different institutions. As a musician he is trained in transverse flute, flute and piano.

As choir director, he has directed different choirs, such as the Coro Euskería of the Sociedad Coral de Bilbao, Coral Gaztelumendi, Coro de Voces Blancas Antxieta and others. He has been directing the Deustoarrak Choir created in 1957 for more than twenty years.

References 

Basque classical composers
1952 births
Living people
20th-century Spanish musicians
21st-century Spanish musicians
Orchestra leaders
Basque musicians